Church Shocklach is a former civil parish, now in the parish of Shocklach Oviatt and District, in the Borough of Cheshire West and Chester and ceremonial county of Cheshire in England. In 2001 it has a population of 113, increasing to 290 at the 2011 Census. The parish included most of the village of Shocklach. The civil parish was abolished in 2015 to form Shocklach Oviatt and District.

See also

Listed buildings in Church Shocklach

References

External links

Former civil parishes in Cheshire
Cheshire West and Chester